Shinshō-ji is a Shingon Buddhist Temple located in Muroto, Kōchi, Japan. It is the 25th temple of the Shikoku Pilgrimage.

References 

Buddhist temples in Japan
Buddhist temples in Kōchi Prefecture
Important Cultural Properties of Japan